A hybrid system is a dynamical system that exhibits both continuous and discrete dynamic behavior – a system that can both flow (described by a differential equation) and jump (described by a state machine or automaton). Often, the term "hybrid dynamical system" is used, to distinguish over hybrid systems such as those that combine neural nets and fuzzy logic, or electrical and mechanical drivelines.  A hybrid system has the benefit of encompassing a larger class of systems within its structure, allowing for more flexibility in modeling dynamic phenomena.

In general, the state of a hybrid system is defined by the values of the continuous variables and a discrete mode. The state changes either continuously, according to a flow condition, or discretely according to a control graph.  Continuous flow is permitted as long as so-called invariants hold, while discrete transitions can occur as soon as given jump conditions are satisfied. Discrete transitions may be associated with events.

Examples

Hybrid systems have been used to model several cyber-physical systems, including physical systems with impact, logic-dynamic controllers, and even Internet congestion.

Bouncing ball
A canonical example of a hybrid system is the bouncing ball, a physical system with impact.  Here, the ball (thought of as a point-mass) is dropped from an initial height and bounces off the ground, dissipating its energy with each bounce.  The ball exhibits continuous dynamics between each bounce; however, as the ball impacts the ground, its velocity undergoes a discrete change modeled after an inelastic collision.  A mathematical description of the bouncing ball follows.  Let  be the height of the ball and  be the velocity of the ball.  A hybrid system describing the ball is as follows:

When , flow is governed by
,
where  is the acceleration due to gravity.  These equations state that when the ball is above ground, it is being drawn to the ground by gravity.

When , jumps are governed by
,
where  is a dissipation factor. Effectively, this describes the nature of the inelastic collision.

The bouncing ball is an especially interesting hybrid system, as it exhibits Zeno behavior.  Zeno behavior has a strict mathematical definition, but can be described informally as the system making an infinite number of jumps in a finite amount of time. In this example, each time the ball bounces it loses energy, making the subsequent jumps (impacts with the ground) closer and closer together in time.

It is noteworthy that the dynamical model is complete if and only if one adds the contact force between the ground and the ball. Indeed, without forces, one cannot properly define the bouncing ball and the model is, from a mechanical point of view, meaningless. The simplest contact model that represents the interactions between the ball and the ground, is the complementarity relation between the force and the distance (the gap) between the ball and the ground. This is written as

Such a contact model does not incorporate magnetic forces, nor gluing effects. When the complementarity relations are in, one can continue to integrate the system after the impacts have accumulated and vanished: the equilibrium of the system is well-defined as the static equilibrium of the ball on the ground, under the action of gravity compensated by the contact force . One also notices from basic convex analysis that the complementarity relation can equivalently be rewritten as the inclusion into a normal cone, so that the bouncing ball dynamics is a differential inclusion into a normal cone to a convex set. See Chapters 1, 2 and 3 in Acary-Brogliato's book cited below (Springer LNACM 35, 2008). See also the other references on non-smooth mechanics.

Hybrid systems verification 
There are approaches to automatically proving properties of hybrid systems (e.g., some of the tools mentioned below). Common techniques for proving safety of hybrid systems are computation of reachable sets, abstraction refinement, and barrier certificates.

Most verification tasks are undecidable, making general verification algorithms impossible. Instead, the tools are analyzed for their capabilities on benchmark problems. A possible theoretical characterization of this is algorithms that succeed with hybrid systems verification in all robust cases implying that many problems for hybrid systems, while undecidable, are at least quasi-decidable.

Other modeling approaches
Two basic hybrid system modeling approaches can be classified, an implicit and an explicit one. The explicit approach is often represented by a hybrid automaton, a hybrid program or a hybrid Petri net. The implicit approach is often represented by guarded equations to result in systems of differential algebraic equations (DAEs) where the active equations may change, for example by means of a hybrid bond graph.

As a unified simulation approach for hybrid system analysis, there is a method based on DEVS formalism in which integrators for differential equations are quantized into atomic DEVS models. These methods generate traces of system behaviors in discrete event system manner which are different from discrete time systems. Detailed of this approach can be found in references [Kofman2004] [CF2006] [Nutaro2010] and the software tool PowerDEVS.

Tools
 Ariadne: A C++ library for (numerically rigorous) reachability analysis of nonlinear hybrid systems
 C2E2: Nonlinear hybrid system verifier
 CORA : A MATLAB Toolbox for reachability analysis of cyber-physical systems, including hybrid systems
 Flow*: A tool for reachability analysis of nonlinear hybrid systems
 HyCreate: A Tool for Overapproximating Reachability of Hybrid Automata
 HyEQ: A Hybrid System Solver for Matlab
 HyPro: A C++ library for state set representations for hybrid systems reachability analysis
 HSolver: Verification of Hybrid Systems
 HyTech: A Model Checker for Hybrid Systems
 JuliaReach: A Toolbox for Set-Based Reachability
 KeYmaera: A Hybrid Theorem Prover for Hybrid Systems
 PHAVer: Polyhedral Hybrid Automaton Verifier
 PowerDEVS: A general-purpose software tool for DEVS modeling and simulation oriented to the simulation of hybrid systems
 SCOTS: A tool for the synthesis of correct-by-construction controllers for hybrid systems
 SpaceEx: State-Space Explorer
 S-TaLiRo: A MATLAB Toolbox for verification of Hybrid Systems with respect to Temporal Logic Specifications

See also
 Hybrid automaton
 Sliding mode control
 Variable structure system
 Variable structure control
 Joint spectral radius
 Cyber-physical system
 Behavior trees (artificial intelligence, robotics and control)
 Jump process (in the context of probability), an example of a (stochastic) hybrid system with zero flow component
 Piecewise-deterministic Markov process (PDMP), an example of a (stochastic) hybrid system and a generalization of the jump process
 Jump diffusion, an example of a (stochastic) hybrid system and a generalization of the PDMP

Further reading
 
 
 
 
 [Kofman2004] 
 [CF2006] 
 [Nutaro2010]

External links
IEEE CSS Committee on Hybrid Systems

References 

Systems theory
Differential equations
Dynamical systems
Control theory